Michael J. Fitzpatrick (born April 15, 1957) is the Assembly member for the 8th District of the New York Assembly. He is a Republican. The district includes portions of Islip and Smithtown, including Kings Park, Smithtown, Nesconset, St. James, Village of the Branch, Head of the Harbor and Nissequogue in Suffolk County on Long Island.

Fitzpatrick was born in Jamaica, Queens and raised in Hauppauge, Long Island. He is a graduate of Hauppauge High School and received his B.A. in business administration from Saint Michael's College in Vermont.

He served on the Smithtown Town Council for 15 years, from 1988 to 2003. He was first elected to the New York State Assembly in November 2002. Fitzpatrick is also an investment associate with UBS in Port Jefferson, New York.

Fitzpatrick is married to the former Lorena Herrera of Chihuahua, Mexico; the couple has two children, Corina and Michael. They reside in St. James, New York.

In 2002, Fitzpatrick was elected to the New York Assembly to replace Assemblyman Thomas Barraga, who retired. He has been re-elected every two years since, never winning with under 60% of the vote.

References

External links
The New York Assembly: Michael J. Fitzpatrick

Living people
Republican Party members of the New York State Assembly
People from Queens, New York
People from St. James, New York
Saint Michael's College alumni
1957 births
People from Hauppauge, New York
21st-century American politicians